The 2021 Marshall Thundering Herd men's soccer team represented Marshall University in men's college soccer during the 2021 NCAA Division I men's soccer season. It was be the 43rd season the university fielded a men's varsity soccer program.  The Thundering Herd, led by fifth-year head coach Chris Grassie, played their home games at Veterans Memorial Soccer Complex as members of Conference USA (C-USA).  

The Thundering Herd entered the 2021 season as defending NCAA Division I men's soccer national champions and ranked first nationally in the preseason polls by United Soccer Coaches, College Soccer News, and Top Drawer Soccer.

Roster 
Updated August 13, 2021

Schedule 
Source:

Exhibitions

Regular season

Conference Tournament

NCAA Tournament

Awards and honors

Rankings

2022 MLS Draft

References

External links 

      

2021
2021 Conference USA men's soccer season
American men's college soccer teams 2021 season
Marshall Thundering Herd men's soccer